The Last Edition is a 1925 American silent drama film directed by Emory Johnson based on the story by Emilie Johnson. The photoplay stars Ralph Lewis as a pressman at the San Francisco Chronicle newspaper. The movie was released on November 8, 1925 by Film Booking Offices of America.

Plot
The story starts by introducing us to Tom McDonald, a pressman and the assistant foreman in the San Francisco Chronicle pressroom. Tom finds out he was passed over for the job of press foreman. The job was given to a younger man. Though disappointed, he takes solace knowing his son Ray McDonald has a good job in the district attorney's office. Tom also has a daughter – Polly.

Clarence Walker a reporter for The Chronicle works in the same building as Tom. Clarence secretly admires Polly McDonald. Currently, Clarence is also working on a hot story about a gang of bootleggers. The bootleggers feel Clarence is getting too close to their operations. They devise a plan to throw Clarence off their track. They create a news diversion by setting up another hot story for Clarence to follow. They frame prominent attorney Ray McDonald on a bribery charge.

Clarence jumps on the new lead, investigates the accusations, and quickly files his bribery story at the front desk of The Chronicles. Clarence's account is deemed a headliner for the newspaper. When the editor checks, they find out there is just enough time for Clarence's bribery story to make The Chronicle'''s last edition. Just as the story is about to hit the presses, Tom McDonald finds out the evening's headline is about his son Ray. After reading the article, Tom knows in his heart that Ray could not be guilty of any bribery charge. Tom becomes enraged and attempts to destroy the press.

Tom's attempted destruction fails. During this time, the entire Chronicle plant burns to the ground. Tom is blamed for the fire. He is immediately thrown in jail, coincidentally in the same cell as his son.

Clarence believes Tom when he says his son is innocent. Clarence teams up with Polly to investigate the circumstances surrounding the bribery charge. After working together, they uncover evidence exonerating both father and son. A new plant is constructed; Tom is promoted to foreman; Clarence marries Polly.

Cast
{| 
! style="width: 140px; text-align: left;" |  Actor
! style="width: 230px; text-align: left;" |  Role
|- style="text-align: left;"
| Ralph Lewis || Tom McDonald
|- 
| Lila Leslie || Mary McDonald
|- 
| Ray Hallor || Ray McDonald
|- 
| Frances Teague || Polly McDonald
|- 
| Rex Lease || Clarence Walker
|- 
| Lou Payne || George Hamilton
|- 
| David Kirby || Red Moran
|- 
| Wade Boteler || Mike Fitzgerald
|- 
| Cuyler Supplee || Gerald Fuller
|- 
| Lee Willard || Aaron Hoffman
|- 
| Will Frank || Sam Blotz
|- 
| Ada Mae Vaughn || Stenographer
|- 
| Billy Bakewell || “Ink” Donovan
|- 
|}
ProductionThe Last Edition was the seventh film in Emory Johnson's eight-picture contract with FBO. 

The motion picture was filmed in and around the "Old Chronicle Building" located at 690 Market Street in downtown San Francisco. However, in 1924, The Chronicle commissioned a new headquarters at 901 Mission Street on the corner of 5th Street. The Chronicle'' completed the move in 1925, shortly after the film crews were finished shooting. It was also filmed around Cosmo Street close to Hollywood Boulevard.

Restoration 
At one time, it was believed no copies of this film had survived. In 2011, Rob Byrne, a Bay Area film preservationist, discovered a surviving copy of the film in the archives of the EYE Film Institute in the Netherlands.

The nitrate film was restored in 2013 by the EYE Film Institute and the San Francisco Silent Film Festival to create two new 35mm exhibition prints. One copy was made available to the EYE Film Institute and the other to the U.S. Library of Congress. The intertitles for the discovered copy were in Dutch and were translated back to the original English.

Gallery

See also
 List of rediscovered films

References

External links

The Last Edition Restored at Vimeo.com
The Last Edition at silentera.com
website about the restoration

1925 adventure films
1920s romance films
1925 films
1925 drama films
American action adventure films
American adventure films
American black-and-white films
American romantic drama films
American silent feature films
Film Booking Offices of America films
Melodrama films
1920s rediscovered films
Rediscovered American films
1920s English-language films
1920s American films
Silent romantic drama films
Silent adventure films
Silent American drama films